= Constitution (Twenty-ninth Amendment) Act, 2017 =

Proposed legislation in Pakistan

The Constitution (Twenty-ninth Amendment) Act, 2017 was a proposed amendment to the Constitution of Pakistan seeking to allow the federal cabinet to authorize a minister or state minister to directly advise the President of Pakistan, rather than having that power solely rest with the Prime Minister.

It was never adopted and never officially became part of the constitution.
